Rudi Altig (18 March 1937 – 11 June 2016) was a German professional track and road racing cyclist who won the 1962 Vuelta a España and the world championship in 1966. After his retirement from sports he worked as a television commentator.

Amateur career

Rudi Altig was born in Mannheim, Baden, Germany, an area which had produced good track riders. He began racing in 1952, following his older brother, Willi. The brothers teamed for madison and other two-man races, becoming the best in the country. The British promoter, Jim Wallace, booked Altig to ride with Hans Jaroszewicz at a meeting on Herne Hill velodrome in Good Friday in 1956. He said:

What a pair they made! They just about slaughtered a top-class field of international riders, with all our best home lads. Only Michel Rousseau, later that year to become world sprint champion, was able to take a points sprint from them. That was in the first sprint, too; thereafter the German pair gained not only every sprint for points but every prime [lap prize] as well ... They went on to Coventry [another meeting held over Easter] and did much the same thing, winning everything in which they rode, so classy was their performance.

Altig became national sprint champion in 1957 and 1958. Then Karly Ziegler, a coach, took over his preparation when he joined the Endspurt Mannheim club and Altig became a pursuiter. He won the 1959 national pursuit championship and won the madison championship with his brother. Later that year he beat many of the world's best pursuiters to become world champion in Amsterdam.

Professional track career
Altig was allowed by the Union Cycliste Internationale to turn professional in 1960 within a year of his world championship. He rode his first professional six-day, in Denmark, that winter. Wallace said:

No man ever settled down better or quicker to a pro career than the able Altig. In the hurly-burly world of indoor track racing. Rudi never seemed a novice. Settling down at once, tearing strips off established stars, he soon started to fill indoor tracks which had long forgotten the welcome sight of a 'house full' sign. He brought back the biggest winter racing boom to Germany for many years, reminiscent of the balmy pre-war days.

He won the world pursuit championship in 1960 and 1961 and won 62 races on the track. He won 22 six-day races, particularly in Germany, including four in Cologne and Dortmund. He never rode the Giro di Lombardia because it clashed with the start of the winter season on the track. He said:

I rode the track because I could win money. If I hadn't been able to win money on the track, I wouldn't have travelled all the velodromes of the world to ride six-days. Now, riders are better paid and they don't need to hammer themselves on the road and the track. We, in our era, we did everything to try to win money. Modern times are different, you have to understand that. You can't compare the two eras. But I don't regret ours.

"He gave his bikes as hard a time as he gave his adversaries," said the writer, Olivier Dazat.

Road career

Altig started his professional career as a track rider; it was Raphaël Géminiani who persuaded him his future was on the road. Altig agreed because fame on the road would give him better contracts on the track. He won the Vuelta a España  and three of its stages in 1962. He led the general classification for five days in his first Tour de France that same season, winning three stages and the points competition, and finishing 31st.

He won his first classic in 1964, the Tour of Flanders after riding 60 km alone and winning by four minutes. In the same year he won the German National Road Race. In 1965 he finished second to Englishman Tom Simpson in the professional road championship in San Sebastián, Spain. Simpson said:

I could not accept that Altig could beat me. Going round the back of the circuit we came to a gentleman's agreement. Both of us had worked hard in our little break and therefore we each deserved an equal chance of victory. We agreed to separate when we reached the one kilometre to go board and ride in side by side. Altig was quite happy about this for I am sure he thought he could put it across me. So there we were, two gentlemen virtually fighting a duel over the last kilometre. I was glad that Altig had accepted my proposal for it was the fairest way out. I have always regarded him as a great rider and his showing that day did nothing to make me change my mind.

But the world title was not denied for long: he won the 1966 championship not too far away from his home, at the Nürburgring. There was controversy because Altig had been helped by Gianni Motta, riding that day for Italy but normally Altig's companion in the Molteni team. The concern was quickly overshadowed by the refusal of the first three riders to give urine samples for a drugs check. They were protesting at what they saw was the laxity with which tests were carried out and at what they considered restrictions on the way they prepared themselves. Altig said: "We are professionals, not sportsmen." The three were disqualified and suspended but ten days later the Union Cycliste Internationale allowed the result to stand.

Altig took three stages in that year's Tour, finishing 12th place overall, and two more in the Giro d'Italia, in which he came 13th.

The second and final classic win came in the 1968 Milan–San Remo. He also took two stages of that year's Vuelta, finishing 18th overall. In 1969 he finished 9th in the Giro, and won the prologue individual time trial of the Tour de France.

Jacques Anquetil
Altig rode his first Tour as a domestique and as team sprinter for Jacques Anquetil. The two developed a rocky relationship in the Tour of Spain that hardened when Altig took the yellow jersey early in the Tour de France. Anquetil criticised him because his team would have to ride at the front and chase every attack to protect a rider too heavy to keep his lead through the mountains. The two never became close until they rode for different teams.

That same year the two were paired for the Trofeo Baracchi, a 111 km two-man time-trial in Italy. The writer René de Latour wrote:

Generally in a race of the Barrachi type, the changes are very rapid, with stints of no more than 300 yards. Altig was at the front when I started the check - and he was still there a minute later. Something must be wrong. Altig wasn't even swinging aside to invite Anquetil through... Suddenly, on a flat road, Anquetil lost contact and a gap of three lengths appeared between the two partners. There followed one of the most sensational things I have ever seen in any form of cycle racing during my 35 years' association with the sport - something which I consider as great a physical performance as a world hour record or a classic road race win. Altig was riding at 30mph at the front - and had been doing so for 15 minutes. When Anquetil lost contact, he had to ease the pace, wait for his partner to go by, push him powerfully in the back, sprint to the front again after losing 10 yards in the process, and again settle down to a 30mph stint at the front. Altig did not this just once but dozens of times.

Anquetil reached the stadium where the race finished and hit a pole. He was helped away with staring eyes and with blood streaming from a cut to his head. The pairing nevertheless won by nine seconds. Altig said: "Jacques wasn't happy [during the race], it didn't please him at all, but I wanted us to win. So I got him by the saddle, I got him by the shorts, and hop!."

Retirement
Altig became directeur sportif of the Puch-Wolber team when he stopped racing and worked for five years as national coach. He was a television commentator. He said of the American rider, Lance Armstrong: "He is a tyrant who exploits his team-mates without leaving them the least initiative." Of his fellow German, Jan Ullrich, he said he would do better to talk less about what he was going to do and get on and do it.

He died on 11 June 2016 in Remagen, Germany, as a result of cancer.

Six-days
Altig won 22 six-days:

(with Hans Junkermann)
1962: Berlin, Münster
1963: Essen
1964: Essen
(with Fritz Pfenninger)
1964: Dortmund, Frankfurt am Main
1970: Dortmund
1971: Bremen, Cologne
(with Dieter Kemper)
1965: Berlin, Frankfurt a. M.
1966: Bremen, Cologne
(with Sigi Renz)
1965: Cologne
1966: Berlin, Dortmund, Zürich
1968: Bremen, Cologne
1969: Ghent
(with Patrick Sercu)
1968: Dortmund, Frankfurt a. M.
(with Klaus Bugdahl)
1968: Münster

Major results

1960
 1st  Individual pursuit, UCI Track World Championships
 1st Stage 7 Deutschland Tour
1961
 1st  Individual pursuit, UCI Track World Championships
 6th Overall Deutschland Tour
1962
 1st  Overall Vuelta a España
1st  Points classification
1st Stages 2, 7 & 15
 Tour de France
1st  Points classification
1st Stages 1, 3 & 17
Held  after Stages 1 & 3–5
 1st Critérium des As
 1st Manx Trophy
 1st GP Cannes
 1st Trofeo Baracchi (with Jacques Anquetil)
 Deutschland Tour
1st Stages 2 & 3
 1st Stage 6 Paris–Nice
1963
 1st  Overall Paris–Luxembourg
1st Stage 1
 2nd Overall Paris–Nice
1st Stages 2 & 5
 2nd Rund um den Henninger Turm
1964
 1st  Road race, National Road Championships
 1st  Overall Vuelta a Andalucía
1st Stages 3 & 4
 1st Tour of Flanders
 1st Grand Prix Union-Brauerei
 Tour de France
1st Stage 4
Held  after Stages 5–7
Held  after Stages 4–6 & 14
 1st Stage 8b (ITT) Paris–Nice
 1st Grand Prix du Parisien
 2nd Paris–Camembert
 3rd Gran Premio di Lugano
 3rd Trofeo Baracchi (with Tom Simpson)
 6th La Flèche Wallonne
 6th Rund um den Henninger Turm
 8th Overall Tour of Belgium
1st Stage 2
1965
 1st Stage 3 Vuelta a España
 Circuit du Provence
1st Stages 1 & 2
 2nd  Road race, UCI Road World Championships
 2nd Overall Paris–Nice
1st Stages 1, 4 & 6b
 2nd Grand Prix des Nations
 3rd Critérium des As
 7th Rund um den Henninger Turm
1966
 1st  Road race, UCI Road World Championships
 Tour de France
1st Stages 1, 12 & 22b (ITT)
Held  after Stages 1–9
Held  after Stage 1
 Giro d'Italia
1st Stages 7 & 11
 1st Giro del Piemonte
 1st Giro di Toscana
 1st Bol d'Or des Monédières
 3rd La Flèche Wallonne
 6th Overall Paris–Nice
1st Stage 3
 6th Paris–Roubaix
1967
 Giro d'Italia
1st Stages 6 & 11
 1st Milano–Vignola
 1st Cronostaffetta (with Gianni Motta and Franco Balmamion)
 3rd Paris–Roubaix
 3rd Giro di Campania
 5th Overall Paris–Luxembourg
1968
 1st Milan–San Remo
 Vuelta a España
1st Stages 3b (ITT) & 5
Held  after Stages 3b–10
 3rd Overall Tirreno–Adriatico
1st Stage 2
 3rd Tour of Flanders
 3rd Gran Premio di Lugano
1969
 Tour de France
1st Prologue
Held  after Prologue
 1st Gran Premio di Lugano
 1st Ronde de Seignelay
 1st Maël-Pestivien
 9th Overall Giro d'Italia
1970
 1st  Road race, National Road Championships
 1st Rund um den Henninger Turm
 1st Classica Sarda
 1st Prologue Tour de Suisse
 1st Stage 3 Paris–Luxembourg
 1st Stage 5 Paris–Nice
 3rd Overall Vuelta a Mallorca
1st Stage 4
 4th Overall Tour de Romandie

References

External links

 
 

1937 births
2016 deaths
Sportspeople from Mannheim
People from the Republic of Baden
German male cyclists
German Tour de France stage winners
Vuelta a España winners
German cycling road race champions
UCI Road World Champions (elite men)
Tour de France prologue winners
Cycling announcers
German Vuelta a España stage winners
Recipients of the Cross of the Order of Merit of the Federal Republic of Germany
Tour de Suisse stage winners
UCI Track Cycling World Champions (men)
German track cyclists
Cyclists from Baden-Württemberg